The Best of Acoustic (2007) is a greatest hits album by Jethro Tull. It includes some of the band's biggest acoustic hits from 1969 to 2007.

Track listing

"Fat Man" - 2:51
"Life is a Long Song" - 3:18
"Cheap Day Return" - 1:22
"Mother Goose" - 3:53
"Wond'ring Aloud" - 1:55
"Thick as a Brick (Intro) (Edit No 1)" - 3:03
"Skating Away on the Thin Ice of the New Day" - 4:11
"Cold Wind to Valhalla (Intro)" - 1:29
"One White Duck / 010 = Nothing at All" - 4:38
"Salamander" - 2:51
"Jack in the Green" - 2:29
"Velvet Green" - 6:03
"Dun Ringill" - 2:41
"Jack Frost and the Hooded Crow" - 3:23
"Under Wraps 2" - 2:14
"Jack-a-Lynn" - 4:56
"Someday the Sun Won't Shine for You" - 2:01
"Broadford Bazaar" - 3:39
"The Water Carrier" - 2:56
"Rupi's Dance" - 3:01
"A Christmas Song" - 2:41
"Weathercock" - 4:20
"One Brown Mouse" (2006 version) - 3:41
"Pastime with Good Company (Live in Denmark)" - 4:13

References

External links 
 Official Album Page

Jethro Tull (band) compilation albums
2007 compilation albums